Siena Cathedral is a medieval church in Siena, Italy, dedicated from its earliest days as a Roman Catholic Marian church, and now dedicated to the Assumption of Mary.

It was the episcopal seat of the Diocese of Siena, and from the 15th century that of the Archdiocese of Siena. It is now the seat of the Archdiocese of Siena-Colle di Val d'Elsa-Montalcino.

The cathedral was designed and completed between 1215 and 1263 on the site of an earlier structure. It has the form of a Latin cross with a slightly projecting transept, a dome and a bell tower. The dome rises from a hexagonal base with supporting columns. The dome was completed in 1264. The lantern atop the dome was added by Gian Lorenzo Bernini. The bell tower has six bells, where the oldest one was cast in 1149. The nave is separated from the two aisles by semicircular arches. The exterior and interior are constructed of white and greenish-black marble in alternating stripes, with the addition of red marble on the façade. Black and white are the symbolic colors of Siena, etiologically linked to black and white horses of the legendary city's founders, Senius and Aschius. There are thirty-five statues of prophets and patriarchs grouped around the virgin. The finest Italian artists of that era completed works in the cathedral. These artists were Nicola and Giovanni Pisano, Donatello, Pinturicchio, Lorenzo Ghiberti, and Bernini.

Early history 

The origins of the first structure are obscure and shrouded in legend. There was a 9th-century church with the bishop's palace at the present location. In December 1058 a synod was held in this church resulting in the election of pope Nicholas II and the deposition of the antipope Benedict X.

In 1196, the cathedral masons’ guild, the Opera di Santa Maria, was put in charge of the construction of a new cathedral. Works were started with the north–south transept and it was planned to add the main, larger body of the cathedral later, but this enlargement was never accomplished.

By 1215 there were already daily masses said in the new church. There are records from 1226 onwards of the transport of black and white marble, probably for the construction of the façade and the bell tower. The vaults and the transept were constructed in 1259–1260. In 1259 Manuello di Ranieri and his son Parri carved some wooden choir stalls, which were replaced about 100 years later and have now disappeared. In 1264, Rosso Padellaio was paid for the copper sphere on top of the dome.

A second massive addition of the main body of the cathedral was planned in 1339. It would have more than doubled the size of the structure by means of an entirely new nave and two aisles ranged perpendicular to the existing nave and centered on the high altar. The construction was begun under the direction of Giovanni di Agostino, better known as a sculptor. Construction was halted by the Black Death in 1348. Basic errors in the construction were already evident by then, however, and the work was never resumed. The outer walls, remains of this extension, can now be seen to the south of the Duomo. The floor of the uncompleted nave now serves as a parking lot and museum, and, though unfinished, the remains are a testament to Sienese power, ambition, and artistic achievement. One of the walls can be climbed by narrow stairs for a high view of the city.

Underneath the choir of the Duomo, a narthex containing important late 13th-century frescoes (probably about 1280) was found and excavated in 1999–2003. The frescoes depict scenes from the Old Testament and the life of Christ. This was part of the entrance of an earlier church. But when the baptistry was built, this under-church was filled with rubble. The narthex is now open to the public.

The belltower has six bells, the oldest one was cast in 1149.

Façade 

The façade of Siena Cathedral is one of the most fascinating in all of Italy and certainly one of the most impressive features in Siena. Each of the cardinal points (west, east, north, and south) has its own distinct work; by far the most impressive of these is the west façade. Acting as the main entryway to the Duomo proper, it boasts three portals (see Portal (architecture)); the central one is capped by a bronze-work sun.

Built in two stages and combining elements of French Gothic, Tuscan Romanesque architecture, and Classical architecture, the west façade is a beautiful example of Sienese workmanship. Work began on the lower part around 1284. Built using polychrome marble, the work was overseen by Giovanni Pisano whose work on the Duomo's façade and the pulpit was influenced by his father Nicola Pisano.

The lower portion of the façade is designed from Giovanni's original plans. Built in Tuscan Romanesque style it emphasizes a horizontal unity of the area around the portals at the expense of the vertical bay divisions. The three portals, surmounted by lunettes, are based on Giovanni Pisano's original designs, as are much of the sculpture and orientation surrounding the entrances. The areas around and above the doors, as well as the columns between the portals, are richly decorated with acanthus scrolls, allegorical figures and biblical scenes.

Giovanni Pisano was able to oversee his work until about 1296 when he abruptly left Siena, reportedly over creative differences with the Opera del Duomo, the group that oversaw the construction and maintenance of the Siena cathedrals. Pisano's work on the lower façade was continued under the direction of Camaino di Crescentino, but a number of changes were made to the original plan. These included raising the façade due to the raising of the nave of the church and the installation of a larger rose window based on designs by Duccio di Buoninsegna and commissioned by the city of Siena. Work on the west façade came to an abrupt end in 1317 when the Opera del Duomo redirected all efforts to the east façade.

There is debate as to when work on the upper façade was completed. Most scholars agree that it was finished sometime between 1360 and 1370, though when it began again is not known. The work continued to use Pisano's plans for the façade with some adaptations under the direction of Giovanni di Cecco. Di Cecco preferred more elaborate designs, most likely inspired by the Orvieto Cathedral. The façade needed to be much higher than foreseen as the nave had, once again, been raised.

The changes were probably needed to accommodate the raised nave and di Cecco's more elaborate design scheme, heavily influenced by French Gothic architecture, which caused the apparent division of the upper portion of the cathedral. Most noticeably the pinnacles of the upper portion do not continue from the columns flanking the central portal as they normally would in such cathedrals. Instead, they are substantially offset, resulting in a vertical discontinuity which is uncommon in cathedrals of the time as it can lead to structural weakness. To adjust for this imbalance, the towers on each side of the cathedral were opened by adding windows, reducing the weight they needed to support. The upper portion also features heavy Gothic decoration, a marked contrast to the simple geometric designed common to Tuscan Romanesque architecture.

While most of the sculpture decorating the lower level of the lavish façade was sculpted by Giovanni Pisano and assistant depicting prophets, philosophers and apostles, the more Gothic statuary adorning the upper portion—including the half-length statues of the patriarchs in the niches around the rose window—are works of later, unattributed, sculptors. Almost all the statuary adorning the cathedral today are copies. The originals are kept in the Crypt of the Statues in the Museo dell'Opera del Duomo.

Three large mosaics on the gables of the façade were made in Venice in 1878. The large central mosaic, the Coronation of the Virgin, is the work of Luigi Mussini. The smaller mosaics on each side, Nativity of Jesus and Presentation of Mary in the Temple, were made by Alessandro Franchi.

The bronze central door is a recent addition to the cathedral, replacing the original wooden one. The large door, known as the Porta della Riconoscenza, was commissioned in 1946 near the end of the German occupation of Siena. Sculpted by Vico Consorti and cast by Enrico Manfrini, the scenes on the door represent the Glorification of the Virgin, Siena's patron saint.

On the left corner pier of the façade is a 14th-century inscription marking the grave of Giovanni Pisano. Next to the façade stands a column with a statue of the Contrade Lupa, a wolf breast-feeding Romulus and Remus. According to local legend Senius and Aschius, sons of Remus and founders of Siena, left Rome with the statue, stolen from the Temple of Apollo in Rome.

Interior 

In the interior the pictorial effect of the black and white marble stripes on the walls and columns strikes the eye. Black and white are the colours of the civic coat of arms of Siena. The capitals of the columns in the west bays of the nave are sculpted with allegorical busts and animals. The horizontal molding around the nave and the presbytery contains 172 plaster busts of popes dating from the 15th and 16th centuries starting with St. Peter and ending with Lucius III.  The spandrels of the round arches below this cornice exhibit the busts of 36 emperors. The vaulted roof is decorated in blue with golden stars, replacing frescoes on the ceiling, while the formerets (half ribs) and the tiercerons (secondary ribs) are adorned with richly elaborated motifs.

The stained-glass round window in the choir was made in 1288 to the designs of Duccio. It is one of the earliest remaining examples of Italian stained glass. The round stained-glass window in the façade dates from 1549 and represents the Last Supper. It is the work of Pastorino de' Pastorini.

The hexagonal dome is topped with Bernini's gilded lantern, like a golden sun. The trompe-l'œil coffers were painted in blue with golden stars in the late 15th century. The colonnade in the drum is adorned with images and statues of 42 patriarchs and prophets, painted in 1481 by Guidoccio Cozzarelli and Benvenuto di Giovanni. The eight stucco statues in the spandrels beneath the dome were sculpted in 1490 by Ventura di Giuliano and Bastiano di Francesco. Originally they were polychromed, but later, in 1704, gilded.

Next to the first two pillars, there are two fonts, carved by Antonio Federighi in 1462–1463. His basin for the Blessing of Holy Water was later transferred to the chapel of San Giovanni.

The marble high altar of the presbytery was built in 1532 by Baldassarre Peruzzi. The enormous bronze ciborium is the work of Vecchietta (1467–1472, originally commissioned for the church of the Hospital of Santa Maria della Scala, across the square, and brought to the cathedral in 1506). At the sides of the high altar, the uppermost angels are masterpieces by Francesco di Giorgio Martini (1439–1502).

Against the pillars of the presbytery, there are eight candelabras in the form of angels by Domenico Beccafumi (1548–1550), He also painted the frescoes, representing Saints and Paradise, on the walls in the apse. These were partially repainted in 1912. Behind the main altar is a very large painting Assumption of the Virgin by Bartolomeo Cesi in 1594.
The presbytery keeps also the beautiful wooden choir stalls, made between 1363–1397 and extended in the 16th century. Originally there were more than ninety choir stalls, arranged in double rows. The remaining 36 stalls are each crowned by the bust of a saint in a pointed niche. Their backs are decorated with carved panels, the work of Fra’ Giovanni da Verona in 1503.

Pulpit 

The pulpit is made of Carrara marble and was sculpted between the end of 1265 and November 1268 by Nicola Pisano and several other artists. This pulpit expresses the northern Gothic style adopted by Pisano, while still showing his classical influences. The whole message of the pulpit is concerned with the doctrine of Salvation and the Last Judgment. In the top level, seven scenes narrate the Life of Christ. The many figures in each scene with their chiaroscuro effect, show a richness of surface, motion, and narrative. On the middle-level statuettes of the Evangelists and Prophets announce the salvation of mankind. The pulpit itself is the earliest remaining work in the cathedral. The staircase dates from 1543 and was built by Bartolomeo Neroni. At the same time, the pulpit was moved from the choir to its present location.

Mosaic floor 

The inlaid marble mosaic floor is one of the most ornate of its kind in Italy, covering the whole floor of the cathedral. This undertaking went on from the 14th to the 16th centuries, and about forty artists made their contribution. The floor consists of 56 panels in different sizes. Most have a rectangular shape, but the later ones in the transept are hexagons or rhombuses. They represent the sibyls, scenes from the Old Testament, allegories and virtues. Most are still in their original state. The earliest scenes were made by a graffito technique: drilling tiny holes and scratching lines in the marble and filling these with bitumen or mineral pitch. In a later stage black, white, green, red, and blue marble intarsia were used. This technique of marble inlay also evolved during the years, finally resulting in a vigorous contrast of light and dark, giving it an almost modern, impressionistic composition.

The uncovered floor can only be seen for a period of six to ten weeks each year, generally including the month of September. The rest of the year, the pavements near the altar are covered, and only some near the entrance may be viewed.

The earliest panel was probably the Wheel of Fortune (Ruota della Fortuna), laid in 1372 (restored in 1864). The She-Wolf of Siena with the emblems of the confederate cities (Lupa senese e simboli delle città alleate) probably dates from 1373 (also restored in 1864).  The Four Virtues (Temperanza, Prudenza, Giustizia and Fortezza) and Mercy (Misericordia) date from 1406, as established by a payment made to Marchese d'Adamo and his fellow workers. They were the craftsmen who executed the cartoons of Sienese painters.

The first known artist working on the panels was Domenico di Niccolò dei Cori, who was in charge of the cathedral between 1413 and 1423. We can ascribe to him several panels such as the Story of King David, David the Psalmist, and David and Goliath. His successor as superintendent, Paolo di Martino, completed between 1424 and 1426 the Victory of Joshua and Victory of Samson over the Philistines.

In 1434 the renowned painter Domenico di Bartolo continued with a new panel Emperor Sigismund Enthroned (Imperatore Sigismundo in trono). The Holy Roman Emperor Sigismund was popular in Siena, because he resided there for ten months on his way to Rome for his coronation. Next to this panel, is the composition in 1447 (probably) by Pietro di Tommaso del Minella of the Death of Absolom (Morte di Assalonne).

The next panel dates from 1473: Stories from the Life of Judith and the Liberation of Bethulia (Liberazione di Betulia) (probably) by Urbano da Cortona.

In 1480 Alberto Aringhieri was appointed superintendent of the works. From then on, the mosaic floor scheme began to make serious progress. Between 1481 and 1483 the ten panels of the Sibyls were worked out. A few are ascribed to eminent artists, such as Matteo di Giovanni (The Samian Sibyl), Neroccio di Bartolomeo de' Landi (Hellespontine Sibyl) and Benvenuto di Giovanni (Albunenan Sibyl). The Cumaean, Delphic, Persian and Phrygian Sibyls are from the hand of the obscure German artist Vito di Marco. The Erythraean Sibyl was originally by Antonio Federighi, the Libyan Sibyl by the painter Guidoccio Cozzarelli, but both have been extensively renovated. The large panel in the transept The Slaughter of the Innocents (Strage degli Innocenti) is probably the work of Matteo di Giovanni in 1481. The large panel below, the Expulsion of Herod (Cacciata di Erode), was designed by Benvenuto di Giovanni in 1484–1485. The Story of Fortuna, or Hill of Virtue (Allegoria della Fortuna), by Pinturicchio in 1504, was the last one commissioned by Aringhieri. This panel also gives a depiction of Socrates.

Domenico Beccafumi, the most renowned Sienese artist of his time, worked on cartoons for the floor for thirty years (1518–1547). Half of the thirteen Scenes from the Life of Elijah, in the transept of the cathedral, were designed by him (two hexagons and two rhombuses). The eight-meter long frieze Moses Striking water from the Rock was executed by him in 1525. The bordering panel, Moses on Mount Sinai was laid in 1531. His final contribution was the panel in front of the main altar: the Sacrifice of Isaac (1547).

Works of art 

The cathedral's valuable pieces of art including The Feast of Herod by Donatello, and works by Bernini and the young Michelangelo make it an extraordinary museum of Italian sculpture. The Annunciation between St. Ansanus and St. Margaret, a masterwork of Gothic painting by Simone Martini and Lippo Memmi, decorated a side altar of the church until 1799, when it was moved to the Uffizi of Florence.

The funeral monument for cardinal Riccardo Petroni (Siena 1250 - Genoa 1314, a jurisconsult of Pope Boniface VIII) was erected between 1317 and 1318 by the Sienese sculptor Tino di Camaino. He had succeeded his father as the master-builder of the Siena cathedral. The marble monument in the left transept is the earliest example of 14th-century funeral architecture. It is composed of a richly decorated sarcophagus, held aloft on the shoulders of four statues. Above the sarcophagus, two angels draw apart a curtain, revealing the cardinal lying on his deathbed, accompanied by two guardian angels. The monument is crowned by a spired tabernacle with statues of the Madonna and Child, Saint Peter and Saint Paul.

In the pavement, in front of this monument, lies the bronze tombstone of Bishop Giovanni di Bartolomeo Pecci, bishop of Grosseto, made by Donatello in 1427. It shows the dead prelate laid out in a concave bier in highly illusionistic low relief. Looking at it obliquely from the end of the tomb, gives the impression of a three-dimensionality. It was originally located in front of the high altar and moved to the present location in 1506.

The wall tomb of bishop Tommaso Piccolomini del Testa is set above the small door leading to the bell tower. It is the work of the Sienese painter and sculptor Neroccio di Bartolomeo de' Landi in 1483.

The Piccolomini Altarpiece, left of the entrance to the library, is the work of the Lombard sculptor Andrea Bregno in 1483. This altarpiece is remarkable because of the four sculptures in the lower niches, made by the young Michelangelo between 1501 and 1504: Saint Peter, Saint Paul, Saint Gregory (with the help of an assistant) and Saint Pius. On top of the altar is the Madonna and Child, a sculpture (probably) by Jacopo della Quercia.

Many of the Duomo's furnishings, reliquaries, and artwork, have been removed to the adjacent Museo dell'Opera del Duomo. This includes Duccio's Maestà altarpiece, some panels of which are scattered around the world or lost. Duccio's large stained glass window, original to the building, was removed out of precaution during WWII for fear of shattering from bombs or fire. A replica has been installed in the Duomo ever since. The glass depicts a typical Sienese religious subject- three panels of the death, Assumption, and Coronation of Mary, flanked by the city's most important patron saints, Saint Ansanus; Saint Sabinus; Saint Crescentius; and Saint Victor, and in four corners are the Four Evangelists.

Chapel of Saint John the Baptist 

The Chapel of Saint John the Baptist is situated in the left transept. At the back of this chapel, amidst the rich renaissance decorations, is the bronze statue of St. John the Baptist by Donatello. In the middle of the chapel is a 15th-century baptismal font. But most impressive in this chapel are the eight frescoes by Pinturicchio, which were commissioned by Alberto Aringhieri and painted between 1504 and 1505. Two of the frescoes were repainted in the 17th century, while a third was completely replaced in 1868. The original paintings in the chapel are: Nativity of John the Baptist, John the Baptist in the desert and John the Baptist preaching. He also painted two portraits: Aringhieri with the cloak of the Order of the Knights of Malta and Kneeling Knight in Armour. These two portraits show us a very detailed background.

The Chigi Chapel 

The small Chigi Chapel (or Cappella della Madonna del Voto) is situated in the right transept. It is the last, most luxurious sculptural addition to the Duomo, and was commissioned in 1659 by the Sienese Chigi pope Alexander VII. This circular chapel with a gilded dome was built by the German architect Johann Paul Schor to the baroque designs of Gian Lorenzo Bernini, replacing a 15th-century chapel. At the back of the chapel is the Madonna del Voto (by a follower of Guido da Siena, 13th century), that even today is much venerated and receives each year the homages of the contrade. On the eve of the battle of Montaperti (4 September 1260) against Florence, the city of Siena had dedicated itself to the Madonna. The victory of the Sienese, against all odds,  over the much more numerous Florentines was ascribed to her miraculous protection.

Two of the four marble sculptures in the niches, are by Bernini himself: Saint Jerome and Mary Magdalene. The other two are Saint Bernardine (Antonio Raggi) and Saint Catherine of Siena (Ercole Ferrata). The eight marble columns are originally from the Lateran Palace in Rome. The bronze gate at the entrance is by Giovanni Artusi.

Piccolomini Library 

Adjoining the cathedral is the Piccolomini Library, housing precious illuminated choir books and frescoes painted by the Umbrian Bernardino di Betto, called Pinturicchio, probably based on designs by Raphael.

The frescoes tell the story of the life of Siena's favorite son, cardinal Enea Silvio Piccolomini,  who eventually became Pope Pius II.  He was the uncle of cardinal Francesco Todeschini Piccolomini (then archbishop of Siena and the future pope Pius III), who commissioned this library in 1492 as a repository of the books and the manuscript collection of his uncle. The ceiling is covered with painted panels of mythological subjects. They were executed between 1502 and 1503 by Pinturicchio and his assistants.

The entrance is a finely carved marble monument with two openings with round arches, executed in 1497 by Lorenzo di Mariano. It contains a round relief of St. John the Evangelist (probably) by Giovanni di Stefano and, below the altar, a polychrome Pietà by the sculptor Alberto di Betto da Assisi in 1421. Above this marble monument is a fresco of the Papal Coronation of Pius III by Pinturicchio in 1504.  

In the middle of the library is the famous statue Three Graces, a Roman copy of a Greek original. 

Pinturicchio painted this cycle of frescoes around the library between 1502 and 1507, representing Raphael and himself in several of them. This masterpiece is full of striking detail and vivacious colours. Each scene is explained in Latin by the text below. They depict ten remarkable events from the secular and religious career of pope Pius II, first as a high prelate, then bishop, a cardinal and ultimately pope:

 Enea Silvio Piccolomini (ESP) leaves for the Council of Basel. The storm scene in the background is a first in western art.
 ESP, ambassador at the Scottish Court
 ESP crowned court poet by emperor Frederick III
 ESP makes an act of submission to Pope Eugene IV
 ESP, bishop of Siena, presents emperor Frederick III with his bride-to-be Eleanora of Portugal at the Porta Camollia in Siena.
 ESP receives the cardinal's hat in 1456
 ESP, enters the Lateran as pontiff in 1458
 Pius II convokes a Diet of Princes at Mantua to proclaim a new crusade in 1459
 Pius II canonizes Saint Catherine of Siena in 1461
 Pius II arrives in Ancona to launch the crusade.

Beneath the frescoes, the psalters of the cathedral's sacristy are on display. These exquisite illuminations by Liberale da Verona and Girolamo da Cremona were executed between 1466 and 1478 and later carried on by other Sienese illuminators.

Baptistry 

Unlike Florence or Pisa, Siena did not build a separate baptistry. The baptistry is located underneath the eastern bays of the choir of the Duomo. The construction of the interior was largely performed under Camaino di Crescentino and was completed about 1325. The main attraction is the hexagonal baptismal font, containing sculptures by Donatello, Jacopo della Quercia and others.

Also at this level under the Duomo is a crypt excavated beginning in 1999, which contains relics of Siena's key patron saints and frescoes from the 12th and 13th centuries. A small glass-covered opening in the floor of the left transept peers down into it. The crypt can be accessed by visitors with a ticket like the rest of the complex.

See also
 History of medieval Arabic and Western European domes
 List of Gothic Cathedrals in Europe
 Roman Catholic Marian churches

Gallery

Notes

External links 

 
Slides of Siena Cathedral by Branson DeCou from the UC Santa Cruz Library Digital Collections
The Gargoyles of the Duomo

Churches completed in 1215
13th-century Roman Catholic church buildings in Italy
Cathedral
Siena
Gothic architecture in Siena
Unfinished cathedrals
Church buildings with domes
13th-century establishments in the Republic of Siena
Cathedrals in Tuscany